Andriy Tlumak (born 1979) is a retired professional Ukrainian football player and former manager of FC Volyn Lutsk.

Career 

Andriy Tlumak started his football career in Lviv, Ukraine, playing in the local football academy. He made his professional debut at local club FC Karpaty Lviv, where later he spent most of his career. After several seasons at Karpaty, Tlumak secured the starting position in goal and was even considered for Ukraine National Team, but due to high competition he has not made a debut yet. For a brief time in 2005, Tlumak was loaned to FC Metalurh Zaporizhya, however unable to impress the club he returned to Lviv.

In the summer of 2007, it was announced that Tlumak has signed a contract with one of the leaders of Ukrainian Premier League, FC Metalist Kharkiv, he has remained there since.

Until 2012, Tlumak was playing in the position of goalkeeper for the Ukrainian club FC Karpaty Lviv.

Personal life 
His older son, Yuriy (born 2002) is also a professional football player, and younger, Maksym (born 2008) now is attached to the FC Karpaty Lviv youth sportive school.

References

External links 
 Tlumak's profile on Metalist's official website
 Interview with Andriy Tlumak
 

1979 births
Living people
People from Stryi
FC Karpaty Lviv players
FC Karpaty-2 Lviv players
FC Karpaty-3 Lviv players
FC Hazovyk Komarno players
FC Metalist Kharkiv players
FC Metalurh Zaporizhzhia players
FC Zorya Luhansk players
SCC Demnya players
FC Shakhtar Chervonohrad players
Ukrainian Premier League players
Ukrainian First League players
Ukrainian Second League players
Ukrainian footballers
Association football goalkeepers
Ukrainian football managers
FC Volyn Lutsk managers
FC Karpaty Lviv managers
Sportspeople from Lviv Oblast